Persian Gulf University (also known as PGU) is a public university located in the capital city of Bushehr, Bushehr province, Iran. Established in 1991 as Bushehr University and grew rapidly over the years. PGU is the largest and the first public university ever founded in the Bushehr province, Iran. It is considered one of the best and the most well-known universities in the south of Iran, bordering with the Persian Gulf, and has an excellent reputation for teaching quality, academic research, and graduate employability. The government of Iran partly provides its research funding. Also, several industrial companies have supported Persian Gulf University and provided research funding for the desired programs and projects. Besides, PGU has signed agreements with international universities for research and educational collaborations.

History
Persian Gulf University is located in the coastal city of Bushehr. It is a public university accredited by Ministry of Science, Research, and Technology. Established in 1991 as Bushehr University, it started as a "Technical & Engineering College" with two Mechanical and Civil Engineering majors. It is also one of the best universities in the southern part of Iran. Compared with other universities worldwide, it is a young and growing university in basic and applied sciences.
Today, Persian Gulf University (PGU) consists of eight faculties that offer undergraduate courses leading to bachelor's degrees (B.A or B.Sc.) in 29 disciplines, postgraduate courses leading to master's degrees (M.A or M.Sc.) in 54 subjects, and doctoral courses leading to PhD degrees in 12 subjects. Persian Gulf University is limited to the students who pass the national entrance examination administered annually by the Iranian Ministry of Science, Research and Technology.

Faculties
 Faculty of Humanities
Library Sciences and Management, Arabic Language and Literature, English Language and Literature, Accounting, Industrial Management, Business Management, Economics, History, and Psychology

 Faculty of Arts and Architecture
Architecture

 Faculty of Engineering
Mechanical Engineering, Marine Engineering, Civil Engineering. 
 Faculty of Nano and BioSciences and Technology
Biotechnology, Physics, Chemistry, Biology, fishery.
 Faculty of Agricultural Engineering
Horticulture, Plants Production

 Faculty of Petroleum, Gas and Chemical Engineering

Petroleum Engineering, Chemical Engineering (Gas), Chemical Engineering (Petrochemical, Chemical Engineering (Hydrocarbons)

 Faculty of Engineering and Technology of Jam
Computer Engineering, Industrial Engineering

 Faculty of Business and Economics School
Business Administration, Industrial Management, Economics Science, Accounting
 Faculty of Intelligent Systems Engineering and Data Science
Computer Engineering (Recently added: MSc in Artificial intelligence), Electrical Engineering, Mathematics, Statistics (Recently added: MSc in Data Science)
 Faculty of Marine Science and Technology
Intercontinental Transportation Management

 Persian Gulf Research Institute

Prospective Students
This university offers new and equipped faculties with modern types of equipment and laboratories. Additionally, most of the dorms, especially for graduate students and girls, are new and near the university. Other dormitories have also been renovated. However, it is a good idea to ask other students and also the university authorities about them before your final decision. (Due to some limitations, contact with the university and other students is highly recommended!)

However, this university has Science and Technology Park and Morvarid (Pearl) Technology Complex, APA Cyber Security Center, and an accelerator for startups, and an equipped library in each faculty. Moreover, you can always enjoy the various coffee shops inside and outside the faculties and colleges and the large dining hall of the university inside the campus.

Gallery

Administration
 Dr. Mohammad Modarresi (Chancellor)
 Dr. Mahmoud Afshari (vice Chancellor for Education)
 Dr. Rouhollah Fatehi (Vice Chancellor for Research and Technology)
 Dr. Abdolkarim Hosseinpour (Vice Chancellor for Planning and Development)
 Dr. Sayed Esmaeil Mousavi (Vice-chancellor for Financial and Administrative Affairs)
 Dr. Ali Dindarloo (Vice Chancellor for Cultural and Student Affairs)
 Dr. Leila Rezaei (Director of Chancellor's Office and Public Relations)

 Address
Persian Gulf Street, Bushehr 7516913817 IRAN

References

External links
Official website

Universities in Iran
Educational institutions established in 1991
Education in Bushehr Province
Buildings and structures in Bushehr Province
1991 establishments in Iran